Simple Simon is a 1922 British romance film directed by Henry Edwards and starring Edwards, Chrissie White and Mary Dibley. A cynical journalist attempts to seclude a naive monk, but he is rescued by a beautiful village girl.

Cast
 Henry Edwards - Simon 
 Chrissie White - Rosemary Ruth 
 Mary Dibley - Sylvia Royal 
 Hugh Clifton - Mark 
 Henry Vibart - Abbot 
 Esme Hubbard - Minty Weir 
 E.C. Matthews - Adam Spice

References

External links

1922 films
British silent feature films
1922 romantic drama films
Films directed by Henry Edwards
British black-and-white films
British romantic drama films
Hepworth Pictures films
1920s English-language films
1920s British films
Silent romantic drama films